Map of places in East Ayrshire compiled from this list
See the list of places in Scotland for places in other counties.

This List of places in East Ayrshire is a list of links for any town, village, hamlet, castle, golf course, historic house, nature reserve, reservoir, river and other place of interest in the East Ayrshire council area of Scotland.

A
Auchinleck, Auchinleck House, Auchinleck railway station

B
Barr Castle
Battle of Mauchline Muir
Black Loch
Busbie Castle
Bellsbank

C
Catrine
Chapeltoun
Corsehill, Corsehill Lighthouse
Craigmalloch
Creoch Loch
Cronberry
Crosshouse, Crosshouse railway station
Cumnock

D
Dalmellington
Dalrymple
Darvel
Dean Castle
Deil's Dyke
Dick Institute
Drongan
Dunlop

F
Fenwick

G
Galston
Gatehead, East Ayrshire, Gatehead railway station
Greenholm

H
Hurlford

K
Kay Park
Kilmarnock, Kilmarnock and Troon Railway, Kilmarnock Cross, Kilmarnock railway station, Kilmarnock railway viaduct 
Kilmaurs, Kilmaurs Place, Kilmaurs railway station
Knockentiber

L
Lady's Well
Laigh Kirk
Laigh Milton Viaduct
Loch o' th' Lowes
Logan
Loudoun, Loudoun Castle, Loudoun Hill
Lowes Loch
Lugar, Lugar Water
Lugton

M
Mauchline, Battle of Mauchline Muir
Moot Hill
Moscow
Muirkirk

N
Netherthird
New Cumnock, New Cumnock railway station
Newmilns

O
Ochiltree

P
Palace Theatre
Patna
Polnessan
Priestland

R
Rankinston
Riccarton, Ayrshire
River Ayr, River Doon, River Irvine
Rugby Park

S
Sorn, Sorn Castle
Stair, Stair House
Stewarton, Stewarton railway station

T
Thorntoun, Thorntoun house and estate
Trabboch

W
Waterside

See also
List of places in Scotland

East Ayrshire
Geography of East Ayrshire
Lists of places in Scotland
Populated places in Scotland